Siobhan Fallon Hogan (pronounced  , born May 13, 1961) is an American actress and comedian. She has appeared in films such as Men in Black, Forrest Gump, The Negotiator, Holes, Daddy Day Care, Going in Style, and The House That Jack Built.

Life and career
Fallon was born in Syracuse, New York, United States, the daughter of Jane (née Eagan) and William J. Fallon, an attorney. She was raised Catholic, and is of Irish descent. She graduated from Le Moyne College in 1983 and then two years later, she earned her Masters in Fine Arts from The Catholic University of America in Washington D.C. She made her television debut in an episode of The Golden Girls in 1990. She appeared in 20 episodes on Saturday Night Live from 1991 to 1992. She also appeared in three episodes of Seinfeld as Elaine Benes' annoying roommate Tina. Thereafter, she began to appear in feature films. In 2000, she shared the screen with Björk in Dancer in the Dark by Lars von Trier, as a sympathetic jail guard. She also is featured on the soundtrack Selmasongs by Björk, dueting on the track 107 steps. In 2003, she appeared as Mrs. Yelnats in the film Holes with Sigourney Weaver and Shia LaBeouf. She appeared in New in Town, released on January 30, 2009, with Renée Zellweger and Harry Connick Jr.

Personal life
Siobhan Fallon is a member of the Atlantic Theater Company. She had been a resident of Middletown Township, New Jersey and also has a summer home in Cazenovia, New York, a town outside Syracuse, where she grew up. A resident of Rumson, New Jersey, Fallon is married to commodities trader Peter Hogan and they have three children: Bernadette, Peter, and Sinead.

Fallon is a Catholic. If she finds a role that does not suit her beliefs, she will reject it.

In 2021, Fallon wrote and starred in Rushed, co-produced by Lars von Trier's Zentropa Entertainment, and featuring Ellen Cleghorne. Also starring Robert Patrick, Jake Weary and Peri Gilpin, Vertical Entertainment has acquired the distribution rights.

Filmography

Film

Television

References

External links
 
 

1961 births
20th-century American actresses
21st-century American actresses
Actresses from Syracuse, New York
American film actresses
American people of Irish descent
American sketch comedians
American television actresses
American women comedians
Catholic University of America alumni
Comedians from New York (state)
Le Moyne College alumni
Living people
People from Middletown Township, New Jersey
People from Rumson, New Jersey
Catholics from New Jersey
20th-century American comedians
21st-century American comedians
Actresses from New Jersey